Morgane Stapleton (née Hayes), is an American singer-songwriter and the wife of Chris Stapleton. She performs background, harmony and duet vocals in her husband's band and was instrumental in the creation of his debut album Traveller. A songwriter in her own right, she has written material that has been recorded by Carrie Underwood, Kellie Pickler and LeAnn Rimes among others and also appeared as a background session vocalist on records by Underwood, Pickler, Lee Ann Womack and Joe Nichols.

Discography

As a featured/guest artist

As a background vocalist

Songwriting credits

Personal life
Morgane is married to singer-songwriter Chris Stapleton, whom she met while they were working at adjacent publishing houses. Their fifth child was born on May 12, 2019.

Awards and nominations

References

Living people
American women singer-songwriters
American women country singers
American country singer-songwriters
1983 births
Country musicians from Tennessee
21st-century American women
Singer-songwriters from Tennessee